Andriy Valentynovych Yakovlyev (born 20 February 1989) is a Ukrainian football midfielder who plays for Kraft.

References

External links

1989 births
Living people
Ukrainian footballers
Footballers from Kharkiv
Association football midfielders
Ukrainian expatriate footballers
Expatriate footballers in Latvia
Expatriate footballers in Uzbekistan
Expatriate footballers in Slovakia
Expatriate footballers in Belarus
Expatriate footballers in Russia
Expatriate footballers in Moldova
Expatriate footballers in Kazakhstan
Expatriate footballers in Greece
Expatriate footballers in Armenia
Expatriate footballers in Lithuania
Expatriate footballers in Finland
Ukrainian expatriate sportspeople in Latvia
Ukrainian expatriate sportspeople in Uzbekistan
Ukrainian expatriate sportspeople in Slovakia
Ukrainian expatriate sportspeople in Belarus
Ukrainian expatriate sportspeople in Russia
Ukrainian expatriate sportspeople in Moldova
Ukrainian expatriate sportspeople in Kazakhstan
Ukrainian expatriate sportspeople in Greece
Ukrainian expatriate sportspeople in Armenia
Ukrainian expatriate sportspeople in Lithuania
Ukrainian expatriate sportspeople in Finland
Latvian Higher League players
Slovak Super Liga players
Uzbekistan Super League players
Kazakhstan Premier League players
Belarusian Premier League players
Russian First League players
Moldovan Super Liga players
Ukrainian First League players
Ukrainian Second League players
Armenian Premier League players
A Lyga players
Kakkonen players
FC Shakhtar-3 Donetsk players
FC Stal Kamianske players
JFK Olimps players
FC Metalurh Donetsk players
FC Nasaf players
FC Poltava players
1. FC Tatran Prešov players
FC Slutsk players
FC BATE Borisov players
FC Sokol Saratov players
CSF Bălți players
FC Taraz players
Niki Volos F.C. players
FC Volyn Lutsk players
FC Ararat Yerevan players
FK Palanga players
Speranța Nisporeni players
Närpes Kraft Fotbollsförening players